Standiford may refer to:

Standiford Field, former name of Louisville International Airport
Standiford, Louisville, defunct neighborhood in Kentucky, U.S.

People with the surname Standiford
Elisha Standiford (1831–1887), American politician
Ethel Standiford-Mehling (1871–1963), American photographer
Les Standiford, American author

See also
Sandiford (disambiguation)